Pavel Shorats (born 30 January 1998) is a Belarusian professional football player who plays for Lida.

External links
Profile on FC Lida website

1998 births
Living people
People from Lida
Sportspeople from Grodno Region
Belarusian footballers
Belarusian expatriate footballers
Expatriate footballers in Poland
Association football defenders
FC Lida players
FC Energetik-BGU Minsk players